Mohd Badrul Azam Mohd Zamri is a Malaysian professional football player who is currently unattached, having most recently played for Perak FA in the Malaysian Super League as a midfielder.

Before joining Perak in 2012, he formerly played with Felda United FC, Perlis FA and defunct club Melaka TMFC. His league debut for Perak was in the first match of the season against Terengganu on 10 January 2012. An injury sustained during a league match made him miss almost all of Perak's league matches for the season, and was ruled out of the season's ending tournament 2012 Malaysia Cup. He was released by Perak at the end of the season.

References

External links
 

Living people
Malaysian footballers
1984 births
Perlis FA players
Perak F.C. players
People from Perak
Malaysian people of Malay descent
Association football midfielders